David Edwards (December 2, 1971 – March 24, 2020) was an American basketball player. A 5'10" point guard, he played college basketball for Georgetown and Texas A&M before going on to play professionally in Europe. In 1996, he set the Úrvalsdeild karla assists single game record with 18.

High school career
Edwards was born in Richmond, Virginia and moved to New York City before high school, living in public housing. and played at Andrew Jackson High School under coach Chuck Granby. At Jackson he averaged 41 points per game as a senior. His 947 points during that season was a New York City scoring record. He was considered to be one of the best players to ever come out of Queens, New York. His ability led to debate as to whether or not he was better than future NBA player Kenny Anderson. Edwards played streetball at Rucker Park and was known to impress the crowd. He committed to Georgetown over offers from Iowa and Loyola Marymount.

College career
Edwards played initially at Georgetown University, where he averaged 5.4 points per game as a freshman. He posted 14 assists in this first game. Through his first 12 games Edwards led the Hoyas with 89 assists. He experienced disagreements with coach John Thompson and transferred. This disagreement was based on Thompson focusing on big men such as Alonzo Mourning and Dikembe Mutombo, and Edwards later admitted was immature and was not "a complete player."

Edwards transferred to play at Texas A&M under Kermit Davis, but Davis resigned after one season due to recruiting violations. Davis was replaced as head coach by Tony Barone, and Edwards needed time to adjust to the coach's structured offense. As a senior, he averaged 13.3 points, 5.6 rebounds and 8.8 assists per game. He was one of six players to post a triple-double on consecutive games on March 5, and March 10, 1994. His 265 assists as a senior remain a school record. During his senior season at Texas A&M, he was the runner-up for the Frances Pomeroy Naismith Award, given to the best senior in the country under 6-feet tall. Edwards was a three-time All-Southwest Conference selection. During his career at Texas A&M, he tallied 1,167 points, 602 assists and 228 steals, and he was the school's total assists and steals leader until 2016 when he was surpassed by Alex Caruso. Edwards maintained a 6.5 Assists college average  while Caruso had a 4.7 assists college average.

Professional career

Lithuania
Edwards began his professional basketball career with BC Šilutė in the Lithuanian Basketball League during the 1995–1996 season where he averaged 23.2 points, 8.7 assists and 4.4 steals per game, leading the league in assists and steals while coming in second in the league in scoring.

Iceland
He signed with KR in the Icelandic Úrvalsdeild karla in October 1996, replacing Champ Wrencher. In his first game on 17 October, he had 22 points, 8 rebounds and 7 assists in a 79–79 tie against ÍA in the Icelandic Company Cup. In the second game, he had 12 points, 13 assists and 7 steals in KR's 82–79 victory. He helped KR to the finals of the Company Cup in November where they lost to Keflavík 101–107. In the game, Edwards had 25 points, 10 assists and 5 steals. In his six games in the Company Cup, he averaged 18.2 points and 10.5 assists.

On 8 December, Edwards set a Úrvalsdeild record with 18 assists in a 88–91 loss against ÍR, breaking Jón Kr. Gíslason's old record of 17 assists set in 1991. The record stood until 21 November 2022, when it was broken by Vincent Malik Shahid. On 15 December, he scored a season high 38 points in a 106–111 loss against Grindavík in the Úrvalsdeild. Following the game, he had a heated discussion with referee Helgi Bragason which ended with Helgi disqualifying him from the game which automatically resulted in a 1-game suspension. Following the Christmas break, Edwards was replaced by Geoff Herman. He appeared in 8 games in the Úrvalsdeild, averaging 20.8 points, 10.4 assists and 4.3 assists per game.

Post-basketball career
Edwards served as a recreation manager at the non-profit organization Elmcor Youth and Services Activities. He coached basketball at The Mary Louis Academy in Queens.

Personal life and death
His father, Dave Edwards was a 4-year player and a 3-year captain at Virginia Commonwealth University. He had two sons, David and Corey. Corey played basketball at George Mason and coaches at Montverde Academy.

Edwards died of COVID-19 on March 24, 2020.

References

External links
David Edwards College Stats – College Basketball at Sports-Reference.com
Profile at Eurobasket.com
Úrvalsdeild statistics at Icelandic Basketball Association
LKL statistics at LKL

1971 births
2020 deaths
American expatriate basketball people in Iceland
American expatriate basketball people in Lithuania
American men's basketball players
Basketball players from New York City
BC Šilutė basketball players
Deaths from the COVID-19 pandemic in New York (state)
Georgetown Hoyas men's basketball players
KR men's basketball players
Point guards
Sportspeople from Queens, New York
Street basketball players
Texas A&M Aggies men's basketball players
Úrvalsdeild karla (basketball) players